2,4-Dimethyl-6-tert-butylphenol is the organic compound with the formula Me2(tert-Bu)C6H2OH (Me = methyl, tert-Bu = tertiary butyl).  It is a colorless oil that is classified as an alkylated phenol.

Preparation, reactions, uses
It is used as an  antioxidant, e.g. to prevent gumming in fuels, and as an ultraviolet stabilizer. It is used in jet fuels, gasolines, and avgas. 

It is prepared by alkylation of xylenol with isobutylene.  This alkylation provides a means to separate 2,4-xylenol from 2,5-xylenol since 2,4-dimethyl-6-tert-butylphenol is insoluble in 10% NaOH but 2,5-dimethyl-6-tert-butylphenol is soluble.  Subsequent to separation, the tert-butyl group can be removed in strong acid.

Tradenames
One of its trade names is Topanol A. It is found in antioxidant mixtures AO-30, AO-31, AO-32, IONOL K72, IONOL K78, IONOL K98, and others.

See also
2,6-Di-tert-butylphenol
Butylated hydroxytoluene
Propofol (Structural isomer)
List of gasoline additives

References

Antioxidants
Alkylphenols
Fuel antioxidants
Tert-butyl compounds